Vinaròs Club de Fútbol is a football team based in Vinaròs, in Castellón province, autonomous community of Valencian Community, Spain. Founded in 1965, it plays in Regional Preferente – Group 1. Its stadium is El Cervol, which has a capacity of 9,600 seats.

History
Vinaròs Club de Fútbol was founded in 1965. However, in the past, other football clubs from Vinaròs existed. In 1977, was the first team of Castellón province to play in Segunda División B.

Season to season

2 seasons in Segunda División B
19 seasons in Tercera División
9 seasons in Copa del Rey

Notable former players
 Edu Caballer
 Jordi Pablo Ripollés
 Xisco Nadal
 Florin Andone

Notable former coaches
 Vicente Piquer
 Vicente Dauder

References

External links
 Official website
Futbolme.com profile

Football clubs in the Valencian Community
Association football clubs established in 1965
Divisiones Regionales de Fútbol clubs
1965 establishments in Spain